Jamal Ja'far Muhammad Ali Al Ibrahim (16 November 1954 – 3 January 2020), known by the kunya Abu Mahdi al-Muhandis, also spelled Mohandes, was an Iraqi-Iranian commander of the Popular Mobilisation Forces (PMF). At the time of his death, he was deputy chief of the PMF (Al-Hashd Al-Sha'abi).

From 1977, he was an opponent of Saddam Hussein. He became the commander of volunteer militias that grew from the need to combat ISIS, including the Kata'ib Hezbollah militia group, which is designated a terror organisation by the governments of Japan, the US and the UAE; and prior to that worked with the Iranian Islamic Revolutionary Guard Corps against Saddam's regime.

Allegations of terrorism have been levelled against him over his activities in Kuwait in the 1980s. He was sentenced to death in absentia in 2007 by a court in Kuwait for his involvement in the 1983 Kuwait bombings. Muhandis was on the United States list of designated terrorists. However, this has been disputed due to his role in combating the Ba’ath Party regime rather than supporting it (via attacking Kuwait). The charges were dropped when the new Iraqi government was formed in 2004. The organisations he oversaw, such as the Popular Mobilization Forces have been reported to have close links to the Quds Force, part of the Armed Forces of the Islamic Republic of Iran.   

He was killed by a targeted U.S. drone strike at Baghdad International Airport on 3 January 2020, which also killed Iranian general Qasem Soleimani.

Biography 
Jamal Jaafar al-Ibrahimi was born on 1 July 1954 in Abu Al-Khaseeb District, Basra Governorate, Iraq, to an Iraqi father and an Iranian mother. He finished his studies in engineering in 1977 and in the same year joined the Shia-based Dawa Party, which opposed the Ba'athist government.

Military career
On 1979, after the activity of the Dawa Party was banned and hundreds of opponents were sentenced to death by Saddam Hussein. Al-Muhandis fled, across the border to Ahvaz in Iran, where the Iranians had set up a camp to train Iraqi dissidents, with the aim of undermining Saddam. He was known as Jamal al-Ibrahimi in Iran and he became a citizen of Iran after a marriage. He began working with Iran's Revolutionary Guard in Kuwait in 1983, organizing attacks on embassies of countries that supported Saddam in the Iran–Iraq War. Hours after the December 1983 bomb attacks on U.S. and French embassies in Kuwait, he fled to Iran. He was later convicted and sentenced to death in absentia by a court in Kuwait for planning the attacks. He was later appointed a military adviser to the Quds Force, advising on attacks against Iraqi military based in his hometown of Basra.

He returned to Iraq following the  2003 U.S.-led invasion of Iraq and served as a security adviser to the first Iraqi prime minister after the invasion, Ibrahim al-Jaafari. In 2005, he was elected to the Iraqi Parliament as a Dawa Party representative for the Babil Governorate. When U.S. officials realised his identity and connection with the 1983 attacks, they raised the issue with then-Iraqi prime minister Nouri al-Maliki in 2006 or 2007. He had to flee to Iran. He formed Kata'ib Hezbollah between 2003 and 2007.

He returned to Iraq following the withdrawal of US troops (December 2011) to head the Kata'ib Hezbollah militia; he then became deputy chief of the Popular Mobilization Forces.

On 31 December 2019, U.S. Secretary of State Mike Pompeo named al-Muhandis, along with Qais Khazali, Hadi al-Amiri, and Falih Alfayyadh, as responsible for the attack on the United States embassy in Baghdad.

On 3 January 2020, al-Muhandis was killed along with Qasem Soleimani in a U.S. airstrike at Baghdad International Airport.

War against ISIL in Iraq
After the formation of the Popular Mobilization Forces (PMF) as a group in 2014 that originated to help Iraq defeat ISIL, he was appointed to command the group. The PMF group was composed of some 40 militias that fought in nearly every major battle against ISIL.

Sanctions 
In 2009, al-Muhandis was sanctioned by the United States Department of the Treasury for allegedly helping the IRGC. Muhandis was also accused of being linked to the IJO who participated in 1983 United States embassy bombing in Beirut.

Death

Abu Mahdi was killed on 3 January 2020 around 1:00a.m. local time (22:00 UTC 2January), by the U.S. drone strike which targeted Qasem Soleimani and his convoy near Baghdad International Airport. BBC News, NBC News, DW News, Time, The Guardian and other media outlets have described the killing as an assassination.

Reaction
Palestinian Islamic Jihad (PIJ) group mentioned him as one of the symbols of Iraqi liberation from the US occupation and also condolences to the Iraqi for the death of Abu Mahdi al-Muhandis.

Funeral and burial

On 4 January, a funeral procession for Abu Mahdi al-Muhandis and Soleimani was held in Baghdad with thousands of mourners in attendance, waving Iraqi and militia flags and chanting "death to America, death to Israel". The procession started at the Al-Kadhimiya Mosque in Baghdad. Iraq's prime minister, Adil Abdul-Mahdi, and leaders of Iran-backed militias attended the funeral procession. They were taken to the holy Shia cities of Najaf and Karbala were held funeral prayers on them.

He was transferred to Iran for the DNA test. A funeral procession was started from Ahvaz then was taken them to Mashhad. On 6 January, Iranian Supreme Leader Ali Khamenei held funeral prayers among hundreds of thousands of people and crying in front of the flag-draped coffins for the deceased. On 7 January, his body was returned to Iraq and transferred to his hometown of Basra.  His burial was delayed because of the huge crowd at the funeral. On 8 January, Al-Muhandis was buried in Iraq's Najaf where hundreds of mourners gathered to pay their final respects. Funeral processions were also held in several Iraqi cities prior to Najaf, including Baghdad and Karbala.

First anniversary
On 3 January 2021, the first anniversary of Qassem Soleimani and Abu Mahdi al-Muhandis' deaths was observed in Baghdad. Tens of thousands of Iraqis marched on the highway leading to the airport while chanting anti-American slogans.

See also 
Abu Mahdi (missile)
USA kill or capture strategy in Iraq

References

1954 births
2020 deaths
People from Basra
Iraqi Shia Muslims
Iraqi people of Iranian descent
Iraqi engineers
University of Technology, Iraq alumni
Islamic Dawa Party
Iraqi insurgency (2011–2013)
People of the War in Iraq (2013–2017)
Assassinations in Iraq
Deaths by United States drone strikes in Iraq
Assassinated Iraqi politicians
Members of the Popular Mobilization Forces
Members of the Council of Representatives of Iraq
Anti-Americanism
Individuals related to Iran Sanctions
Individuals designated as terrorists by the United States government
People killed in Central Intelligence Agency operations